Khuzam is a suburb of the city of Ras Al Khaimah, in the United Arab Emirates (UAE). It is the location of the city's Eid Mussalla or outdoor mosque.

References

Populated places in the Emirate of Ras Al Khaimah